Christopher Thomas Hoffman (born 15 February 1981), is a Zimbabwe actor and voice artist. He is best known for the roles in the films Lions for Lambs, Molly's Game and Saints & Sinners.

Personal life
He was born on 15 February 1981 in Harare, Zimbabwe. He has a twin brother, Matt Hoffman.

Filmography

References

External links
 

Living people
21st-century Zimbabwean male actors
1981 births
Zimbabwean male film actors